John Cullen (born May 16, 1990 in La Mirada, California) is an American rugby union athlete who played for the Utah Warriors in the MLR and the United States national rugby union team as a lock. Currently he coaches along side fellow USA eagle Tim Maupin at Des Moines Rugby Club. Located in West Des Moines, Iowa, both John and Tim are working to turn the club into an MLR academy team. In recent years the club has made great strides and are on the come up. John was selected to tour with the USA Selects for the 2013 and 2014 Americas Rugby Championship, and most recently for the 2014 End of Year Tour of Europe.  His debut with the Eagles was in November 2014 against Romania, and he earned his first starting cap against Tonga. He was called in to train at the Summer 2014 High-Performance Camp with the Men's Eagles Sevens team.

Club
Cullen initially played his club rugby with Seattle Saracens, winners of the Okanagan Spring Brewery League as well as the inaugural Elite City Sevens Tournament. He was named to the All-Tournament Team for the 2014 Elite City Sevens Tournament and scored four tries in the 2014 World Club 7s Tournament at Twickenham Stadium as Seattle won the Shield.

College
Cullen was a USA Rugby Collegiate All American at Utah and toured New Zealand with the 2013 Men's Collegiate All-Americans.
Before transitioning to rugby, Cullen was a second-team all-Pac-12 conference left tackle who started 24 games in two seasons for Utah.

References
 http://usarugby.org/mens-eagles-players/item/john-cullen?category_id=384
 http://usarugby.org/mens-eagles-news/item/eagles-depart-bucharest-with-27-17-win

External links
 http://usarugby.org/mens-eagles-players/item/john-cullen?category_id=384
 Player Profile via PRM Rugby

1990 births
Living people
American rugby union players
Seattle Saracens players
United States international rugby union players
Utah Warriors players
People from La Mirada, California
Rugby union locks
Rugby union number eights